The Icee Company (previously Western Icee and Icee USA) is an American beverage company located in La Vergne, Tennessee, United States. Its flagship product is the Icee (stylized as ICEE), which is a frozen carbonated beverage available in fruit and soda flavors. Icee also produces other frozen beverages and Italian ice pops under the Icee and Slush Puppie brands. ICEE Bear, an animated polar bear, is the company's mascot. 

The Icee Company was founded by Omar Knedlik, the inventor of the original Icee drink. It became the foundation for the Slurpee and other frozen machine drinks after several machines made by the company were purchased by 7-Eleven in 1965. It has been a division of J & J Snack Foods since 1988 and distributes products in the United States, Canada, Mexico, Guatemala, Australia, the United Kingdom, China, and the Middle East.

History 

The Icee was invented in 1958 by Omar Knedlik, a Dairy Queen owner in Coffeyville, Kansas. The beverage was the result of faulty equipment in the Dairy Queen owned by Knedlik. His soda machine broke and he began placing bottles of soda in the freezer to keep them cold. Knedlik began selling bottles of the soda which would instantly turn to slush once opened. The frozen soda became popular with the customers of the establishment.  

The name Icee as well as the original company logo were developed by Ruth E. Taylor, a local artist and friend of Knedlik. She developed the name "Icee", as well as the idea of the logo's icicles hanging from the block letters, which has remained unchanged. She thought of the Polar Bear, but the actual bear mascot had already been created by the Norsworthy-Mercer ad agency. The "Icee" word with the snow on it was designed by a Mitchell Company staff artist, Lonnie Williams, as part of a cup he designed. 

Knedlik partnered with the John E Mitchell Company in Dallas to develop the machine, for which Knedlik received a patent in 1960. The first machine was made from a car air conditioning unit. It worked by combining freezing water, carbon dioxide, and a flavor mix. After five years, Knedlik's idea had become the iconic Icee Machine after drawing the attention of 7-Eleven. The convenience store chain purchased several machines and later changed the product name to Slurpee based on the slurping sound people make when drinking the beverage. 

The Mitchell Company instituted a two-tiered franchise plan involving "Developers" and "Subdevelopers". Essentially, the Developers and Subdevelopers both paid fees and rentals for the right to use specified numbers of Icee dispensers and for rights within exclusive territories to distribute the machines and to promote the sale of the Icee drink. By the mid-1960s, 300 Icee machines had been manufactured.

J & J Snack Foods purchased The Icee Company in 1987. In December 2019, the company moved their headquarters from Ontario, California to La Vergne, Tennessee.

Products and licensing

Drinks
The Icee Company has over 75,000 Icee machines across America serving over 300 million Icee servings per year. McDonald's and Subway restaurants inside Walmart stores sell Icees. Burger King restaurants and Sam’s Club locations in the US sell Icees and Icee Floats. Target and Wawa also sell Icees inside their stores. In Mexico, Icee is widely available at department stores such as Walmart and inside movie theaters and convenience stores. Icee is also the primary frozen beverage sold in Wawa and Quick Chek, two convenience store chains in the Mid-Atlantic region of the US. Icee is available at Valero gas stations co-branded with their CornerStore marts (except for independently owned stores) as well as at most Rainforest Café locations.

In 2019, Icee expanded into the United Kingdom for the first time, by partnering with Vimto, a UK-based international soft drinks manufacturer and distributor.  A Europe-wide contract to supply the Cineworld cinema chain quickly followed.  In late 2019 / early 2020 another European-wide contract to supply Showcase Cinemas further expanded the brand across Europe.

Toys
In January 2020, Moose Toys partnered up with Icee’s Slush Puppie brand to make 4 Special Edition Slush Puppie-themed Shopkins and Mini Packs for Season 13 (Real Littles Season 2) of the Shopkins franchise. The same 4 Shopkins were re-released for Season 14 (or Real Littles Season 3).

In 2021, it was revealed that Moose Toys again partnered up with Icee to make Shopkins and Mini Packs based on the main Icee line of drinks, which will be released in October 2021.

See also
 List of frozen dessert brands

References

External links

Drink companies based in California
Brand name frozen desserts
Companies based in San Bernardino County, California
Food and drink companies established in 1958
J & J Snack Foods Corporation brands
1958 establishments in Kansas